Brent Bilodeau (born March 23, 1973) is an American former professional ice hockey defenseman. He was drafted in the first round (17th overall) of the 1991 NHL Entry Draft by the Montreal Canadiens while a member of the Seattle Thunderbirds of the Western Hockey League.

Professional career

Player
A primarily defensive defenseman, his game was thought to suit Montreal's style of play of the time, but he never played a single game for the Canadiens or any other NHL team. He is the only first round draftee of the 1991 draft not to have played any games in the NHL. He played in minor-pro hockey leagues until he retired as a member of the Johnstown Chiefs of the ECHL after the 2004–05 season.

Coaching
Shortly after his retirement, Bilodeau entered coaching. He started his coaching his career as an assistant with the ECHL's Las Vegas Wranglers for three years before becoming the head coach of the Wichita Thunder of the Central Hockey League in 2008.  He was also an assistant coach for the Tri-City Americans, from 2009–2012.

Personal
Bilodeau was born in Dallas, Texas while his father Yvon was a member of the CHL's Dallas Black Hawks. He learned how to skate at age two and started playing hockey at age five. His father Yvon was a former Philadelphia Flyers draft pick, selected in the 6th round (78th overall) in the 1971 NHL Entry Draft and his uncle Bob was a former Atlanta Flames draft pick, selected in the ninth round (133rd overall) in the 1973 NHL Entry Draft.

He is married to retired American WNBA player Cass Bauer-Bilodeau.

Career statistics

Regular season and playoffs

International

Coaching statistics

Awards
 WHL East Second All-Star Team – 1992 & 1993

References

External links

1973 births
American men's ice hockey defensemen
Canadian ice hockey defencemen
Canadian people of American descent
Fredericton Canadiens players
Hershey Bears players
Ice hockey people from Alberta
Ice hockey people from Texas
Johnstown Chiefs players
Kansas City Blades players
Las Vegas Thunder players
Living people
Montreal Canadiens draft picks
National Hockey League first-round draft picks
People from Westlock County
Saint John Flames players
San Antonio Dragons players
San Francisco Spiders players
Seattle Thunderbirds players
Sportspeople from Dallas
Swift Current Broncos players
Wichita Thunder coaches
Tacoma Sabercats players
Canadian expatriate ice hockey players in the United States